Alexander II (24 August 1198 – 6 July 1249) was King of Scotland from 1214 until his death. He concluded the Treaty of York (1237) which defined the boundary between England and Scotland, virtually unchanged today.

Early life

He was born at Haddington, East Lothian, the only son of the Scottish king William the Lion and Ermengarde de Beaumont. He spent time in England (John of England knighted him at Clerkenwell Priory in 1213) before succeeding to the kingdom on the death of his father on 4 December 1214, being crowned at Scone on 6 December the same year.

King of Scots

In 1215, the year after his accession, the clans Meic Uilleim and MacHeths, inveterate enemies of the Scottish crown, broke into revolt; but loyalist forces speedily quelled the insurrection. In the same year, Alexander joined the English barons in their struggle against King John of England, and led an army into the Kingdom of England in support of their cause. This action led to the sacking of Berwick-upon-Tweed as John's forces ravaged the north.

The Scottish forces reached the south coast of England at the port of Dover where in September 1216, Alexander paid homage to the pretender Louis VIII of France for his lands in England, chosen by the barons to replace John. But since John died, the papacy and the English aristocracy changed their allegiance to his nine-year-old son, Henry III, forcing the French and the Scots armies to return home. Peace between Henry, Louis and Alexander followed on 12 September 1217 with the Treaty of Kingston. Diplomacy further strengthened the reconciliation by the marriage of Alexander to Henry's sister Joan on 18 June or 25 June 1221.

In 1222 Jon Haraldsson, the last native Scandinavian to be Jarl of Orkney, was indirectly implicated in the burning of Adam of Melrose at his hall at Halkirk by local farmers when this part of Caithness was still part of the Kingdom of Norway. A contemporary chronicler, Boethius the Dane blamed Haraldsson for the bishop's death. After the jarl swore oaths to his own innocence, Alexander took the opportunity to assert his claims to the mainland part of the Orkney jarldom. He visited Caithness in person, and hanged the majority of the farmers, while mutilating the rest. His actions were applauded by Pope Honorius III, and a quarter of a century later, he was continuing to receive commendation from the Catholic Church, as in the reward of a bull from Pope Celestine IV.

During the same period, Alexander subjugated the hitherto semi-independent district of Argyll (much smaller than the modern area by that name, it only comprised Craignish, Ardscotnish, Glassary, Glenary and Cowal; Lorn was a separate province, while Kintyre and Knapdale were part of Suðreyar). Royal forces crushed a revolt in Galloway in 1235 without difficulty; nor did an invasion attempted soon afterwards by its exiled leaders meet with success. Soon afterwards, a claim for homage from Henry of England drew forth from Alexander a counter-claim to the northern English counties. The two kingdoms, however, settled this dispute by a compromise in 1237. This was the Treaty of York, which defined the boundary between the two kingdoms as running between the Solway Firth (in the west) and the mouth of the River Tweed (in the east).

Alexander's first wife, Joan, died in March 1238 in Essex. Alexander married his second wife, Marie de Coucy, the following year on 15 May 1239. Together they had one son, Alexander III, born in 1241.

A threat of invasion by Henry in 1243 for a time interrupted the friendly relations between the two countries; but the prompt action of Alexander in anticipating his attack, and the disinclination of the English barons for war, compelled him to make peace the next year at Newcastle.

Alexander now turned his attention to securing the Western Isles, which were still part of the Norwegian domain of Suðreyjar. He repeatedly attempted negotiations and purchase, but without success. Alexander set out to conquer these islands but died on the way in 1249. This dispute over the Western Isles, also known as the Hebrides, was not resolved until 1266 when Magnus VI of Norway ceded them to Scotland along with the Isle of Man.

The English chronicler Matthew Paris in his Chronica Majora described Alexander as red-haired:
[King John] taunted King Alexander, and because he was red-headed, sent word to him, saying, 'so shall we hunt the red fox-cub from his lairs.

Death

Alexander attempted to persuade Ewen, the son of Duncan, Lord of Argyll (and King of the Isles), to sever his allegiance to Haakon IV of Norway. When Ewen rejected these attempts, Alexander sailed forth to compel him, but on the way he suffered a fever at the Isle of Kerrera in the Inner Hebrides. He died there in 1249 and was buried at Melrose Abbey.

The Hákonar saga Hákonarsonar records additional information, in that before attempting to invade the Isles, where Ewen held power, he was supposedly warned in a dream by St. Columba, St. Olaf and St. Magnus to desist. King Ewen of the Isles' status as Monarch had been confirmed by Haakon IV and was disputed by Alexander. The episode might be emblematic of a broader desire on the part of Alexander to bring the Kingdom of the Isles fully into the power of the Scottish Crown. In any case, when he finally decided to continue in his endeavour, despite the dream, and having been advised against it by his men, he died shortly afterwards. The incident was portrayed in the saga as divine punishment. His body was then transported back to the mainland.

He was succeeded by his son, the seven-year-old Alexander III of Scotland.

Family
Alexander II had two wives:

1. Joan of England (22 July 12104 March 1238), who was the eldest legitimate daughter and third child of John of England and Isabella of Angoulême. She and Alexander II married on 21 June 1221, at York Minster. Alexander was 23; Joan was 11. They had no children. Joan died in Essex in 1238, and was buried at Tarant Crawford Abbey in Dorset.

2. Marie de Coucy, who became mother of Alexander III of Scotland.

He also had an illegitimate daughter, Marjorie, who married Alan Durward.

Fictional portrayals

Alexander II has been depicted in historical novels:

 Sword of State (1999) by Nigel Tranter. The novel depicts the friendship between Alexander II and Patrick II, Earl of Dunbar. "Their friendship withstands treachery, danger and rivalry".
 Child of the Phoenix (1992) by Barbara Erskine.
 The Decameron by Giovanni Boccaccio. Day the Second: Third Story.

References

Further reading

 Alexander II at the official website of the British monarchy
 
 
 Worcester Annals
 Rotuli Litterarum Patencium
 
 

 
 

Scottish Roman Catholics
House of Dunkeld
1198 births
1249 deaths
People from Haddington, East Lothian
13th-century Scottish monarchs
12th-century Scottish people
Burials at Melrose Abbey
Gaelic monarchs in Scotland